Graziele Jesus de Sousa, most known as Graziele Jesus, is a Brazilian amateur boxer. She represented Brazil at the 2020 Summer Olympics in Tokyo.

References

External links

1991 births
Living people
Brazilian women boxers
Boxers at the 2020 Summer Olympics
Olympic boxers of Brazil
People from Mogi das Cruzes
South American Games bronze medalists for Brazil
South American Games medalists in boxing
Competitors at the 2018 South American Games
Sportspeople from São Paulo (state)
20th-century Brazilian women
21st-century Brazilian women